Ponteland United Football Club is a football club based in Ponteland, Northumberland, England, UK.

History
Formed back in 1900, Ponteland joined the Northern Alliance at the start of the 1983–84 season, finishing 9th out of 14 in their first season. They played in the league until 1988, when the Northern Alliance split into a three-division format. Since then, Ponteland have always remained in the Premier Division apart from a short time in Division One from 2012 until the 2015/16 season.

The club has finished runner-up twelve time in three different competitions, their highest league positions were in the 1996–97 and 1998–99 seasons, finishing second both times and in 2006–07, they finished 3rd out of 15 teams. They have also finished runners-up in the Northern Alliance Challenge Cup four times −1984-85, 1990–91, 1993–94, and 1997–98. And have been beaten finalists six times in the Northern Alliance Stan Seymour League Cup, including a run of four finals from 1991–1995, during which they lost against different opponents each time.

The club has very sporadically won silverware, winning the Northumberland FA Senior Cup on 2 occasions in 1996 and 2005. The club had to wait until 2010 however before winning the league cup, defeating Shankhouse 3–1 in the Kicks Leisure Challenge Cup.

Following on from their first major league cup honours, Ponteland went on a fantastic run in the 2010–11 season, clinching their first ever league title and pipping Alnwick Town to the championship with a last minute winner against Blyth town (Pont were due to finish 2nd before the goal was scored).

The club also competed in the FA Vase from 1985 to 1997, their best runs being reaching the Third Round in 1992–93 and 1993–94.

Although they always had a reputation as a tough Premier Division side having never been relegated, they finally fell out of the Premier Division in 2012 after a very bad season but returned in 2015/16.

Honours

Northern Alliance Challenge Cup
Runners-up 1984–85, 1990–91, 1993–94, 1997–98
Stan Seymour League Cup
Runners-up 1991–92, 1992–93, 1993–94, 1994–95, 1996–97, 1998–99
Benevolent Bowl
Winners 1995–96, 2004–05
Northern Alliance Premier Division
Winners 2010–11
Runners-up 1996–97, 1998–99
Kicks Leisure Challenge Cup
Winners 2009–10

Records
FA Vase
Third Round 1992–93, 1993–94

References

External links
 Northern Football Alliance
 Ponteland United FC Official Website

Football clubs in England
Football clubs in Northumberland
1900 establishments in England
Association football clubs established in 1900
Northern Football Alliance